'Madonna of Graces with Two Saints is a 1522 fresco painting by Perugino. Its central figure shows Mary as Our Lady of Graces, flanked by Antony the Great and Antony of Padua. It is in a side chapel of the church of Sant’Agnese, the Poor Clares convent in Perugia. It was commissioned a year before the painter's death by Eufrasia and Teodora, two nuns of the convent.

References

Church frescos in Italy
1522 paintings
Paintings by Pietro Perugino
Paintings of the Virgin Mary